Graphoderus occidentalis is a species of predaceous diving beetle in the family Dytiscidae. It is found in North America.

References

Further reading

External links

 

Dytiscidae
Beetles of North America
Beetles described in 1883
Taxa named by George Henry Horn
Articles created by Qbugbot